is a railway station in Moriyama-ku, Nagoya, Aichi Prefecture,  Japan, operated by Meitetsu.

Lines

Station layout
The station has two opposed side platforms, connected to the station building by a footbridge. The station has automated ticket machines, Manaca automated turnstiles and is unattended..

Platforms

Adjacent stations

|-
!colspan=5|Nagoya Railroad

Station history
It was named after its location in front of an Imperial Japanese Army base occupied by the IJA 33rd Infantry Regiment of the IJA 3r d Division. The Seto Electric Railway was absorbed into the Meitetsu group on September 1, 1939, and the station was renamed  on February 10, 1941, for security reasons. It assumed its present name on March 15, 1966. A new station building was completed on March 24, 1984. The station has been unattended after August 2006. The Tranpass system of magnetic fare cards with automatic turnstiles was implemented in 2012.

Passenger statistics
In fiscal 2017, the station was used by an average of 1331 passengers daily.

Surrounding area
This station provides access to Camp Moriyama, part of the Japan Ground Self Defence Force Tenth Division, which is responsible for Aichi and surrounding prefectures.

See also
 List of Railway Stations in Japan

References

External links

 Official web page 

Railway stations in Japan opened in 1905
Railway stations in Aichi Prefecture
Stations of Nagoya Railroad
Railway stations in Nagoya